Robert Frederick Smith (born December 1, 1962) is an American billionaire businessman and philanthropist. He is the founder, chairman, and CEO of private equity firm Vista Equity Partners.

Early life 
Smith was born to Dr. William Robert Smith and Dr. Sylvia Myrna Smith, who were both school teachers. He grew up in a predominantly African American, middle-class neighborhood in Denver, Colorado. When he was an infant, his mother apparently carried him at the March on Washington, where the Rev. Dr. Martin Luther King Jr. delivered his "I Have a Dream" speech. He attended Carson Elementary School and East High School in Denver.

In high school, he applied for an internship at Bell Labs but was told the program was intended for college students. Smith persisted, calling each Monday for five months. When a student from M.I.T. did not show up, he got the position, and that summer he developed a reliability test for semiconductors. Smith earned a bachelor's degree in chemical engineering from Cornell University in 1985. In 1994, he received his Master of Business Administration from Columbia University with concentrations in finance and marketing.

Career
After graduating from Cornell, Smith worked at Goodyear Tire and Rubber Company, Air Products & Chemicals, and later at Kraft General Foods as a chemical engineer, where he registered two United States and two European patents. From 1994 to 2000, he worked for Goldman Sachs in technology investment banking, first in New York City and then in Silicon Valley. He advised on merger and acquisition activity with companies such as Apple and Microsoft. In 2018, Smith was included in Vanity Fair'''s New Establishment List, which is an annual ranking of individuals who have made impactful business innovations.

Vista Equity Partners
In 2000, Smith founded Vista Equity Partners, a private equity and venture capital firm of which he is the principal founder, chairman and chief executive. According to Black Enterprise magazine, Smith is credited with consistently generating a 30 percent rate of return for his investors from the company's inception to 2020. As of 2019, Vista Equity Partners was the fourth largest enterprise software company after Microsoft, Oracle, and SAP, including all their holdings. Vista has invested in companies such as STATS, Ping Identity, and Jio. As of 2019, Vista Equity Partners had closed more than $46 billion of funding.

In 2016, Smith was named as Private Equity International's Game Changer of the Year for his work with Vista.

The 2019 PitchBook Private Equity Awards named Vista Equity Partners "Dealmaker of the Year".

 Philanthropy 
On May 19, 2019, during his 2019 commencement speech at Morehouse College, Smith pledged a reported $34M in student loan debt, "(including) the debt of parents and guardians incurred" over the educational pursuit of each member of the 2019 graduating class. In a June 2020 report, Time reported the launch of The Student Freedom Initiative, a nonprofit led by Smith, to benefit HBCU students. According to Forbes, "Smith is the first African-American to sign the Giving Pledge, a commitment to contribute the majority of his wealth to philanthropic causes."

Politics

In December 2022, taking a stand together against increasing instances of racism and antisemitism in the US, Smith joined New York City Mayor Eric Adams, Reverends Al Sharpton and Conrad Tillard, World Values Network founder and CEO Rabbi Shmuley Boteach, and Elisha Wiesel to host 15 Days of Light, celebrating Hanukkah and Kwanzaa in a unifying holiday ceremony at Carnegie Hall.  Smith said: "When we unify the souls of our two communities, we can usher in light to banish the darkness of racism, bigotry, and antisemitism."

 Tax evasion 
In August 2020, Bloomberg reported that Smith was facing a tax inquiry regarding a potential failure to pay U.S. taxes on $200 million in assets, intended for U.S. charities, that were transferred through offshore entities. In October 2020, Smith reached a non-prosecution agreement with the United States Department of Justice (DOJ), agreeing to pay a fine of $139 million. This agreement came alongside Smith agreeing to assist the DOJ in creating a separate case against Robert T. Brockman, who had been charged with hiding $2 billion in income. According to the DOJ, Brockman, the backer of Smith’s first private equity fund, led him to use the offshore trust that concealed income.

According to reports in Bloomberg and The Washington Post, Brockman approached Smith in the 1990s about creating a private equity fund and offered to back the initial fund. As part of the deal, Brockman required an offshore trust be set up to conceal earnings from tax authorities and avoid litigation in US courts. Brockman also required the first fund to be located in the Cayman Islands and set aside some of the interest earned to protect him against losses. According to The Wall Street Journal and The New York Times, Brockman's lawyer helped Smith set up the offshore entity.

The reports state that Brockman's proposal was a "take-it-or-leave-it offer". According to Smith's non-prosecution agreement, Brockman dictated "the unique terms and unorthodox structure to the arrangement" and he accepted the offer as a "unique business opportunity he eagerly wanted to pursue".

In early October 2021, Smith and Brockman were both among those listed in the Pandora Papers revelation, exposing the offshore sheltering of financial assets by hundreds of politicians, businesspeople, and celebrities.

Other achievements
In 2014, Smith became the founding director and president of the Fund II Foundation, which has invested in organizations such as Cornell, the National Park Foundation, and Susan G. Komen. Also in 2014, Smith received an honorary doctorate from Huston-Tillotson University.

In 2015, Smith sponsored the college education of all returned Boko Haram girls.

Smith has also served as the chairman of Robert F. Kennedy Human Rights, on the board of overseers of Columbia Business School, as a member of the Cornell Engineering College Council, on the Cornell University Tech Board, and as a Trustee of the Boys & Girls Clubs of San Francisco. He has donated to the Sphinx Organization, which supports diversity in the arts.

Smith became the board chairman of Carnegie Hall in 2016, the first African American to hold that position.

Also that year, Cornell University named the Robert Frederick Smith School of Chemical and Biomolecular Engineering after him, following a donation. He was later recognized as a distinguished alumnus by the college.

Smith was named in The Chronicle of Philanthropy's "Philanthropy 50" in 2017. In May 2017, The Giving Pledge announced that Smith had joined as its first African-American signatory. That year, Smith was awarded an honorary doctorate from the University of Denver.

In 2018, Fund II Foundation gave a $2.7 million grant to the Louis Armstrong House Museum, and Smith has served as a board member since. This grant helped digitize Armstrong's collection to make it available to the public.

In 2018, Smith was the largest individual donor at the City of Hope Gala, which funds prostate cancer treatment and breast cancer research for black men and women. That same year, Smith donated $2.5 million to the Prostate Cancer Foundation to advance prostate cancer research among African-American men. Also in 2018, Smith donated $1 million to the Cultural Performance Center at the Denny Farrell Riverbank State Park in Harlem, which was later renamed the Robert Frederick Smith Center for Performing Arts.

Smith has received the Candle in Business and Philanthropy Award from Morehouse College, the International Medical Corps Humanitarian of the Year Award, Ebony’s John H. Johnson Award, and the Congressional Black Caucus Foundation's Chairman's Award, among others. He was awarded an honorary doctorate of International Affairs from American University's School of International Service and an honorary doctorate from Morehouse College.

In May 2019, while at Morehouse College to receive an honorary doctorate and deliver the commencement address, he announced that he and his family would pay off the entire student loan debt of the 2019 Morehouse College graduating class of 396 students. He had previously donated $1.5 million to the school in January 2019, to be used for scholarships and a park.

In October 2019, Smith received the Carnegie Medal of Philanthropy, which is given to individuals who have donated private wealth to the public. Smith was also inducted into the Texas Business Hall of Fame as a Class of 2019 Legend. In April 2020, Governor Greg Abbott named Smith to the Strike Force to Open Texas – a group "tasked with finding safe and effective ways to slowly reopen the state" amid the COVID-19 pandemic. Smith was included on the Time 100, Times list of the 100 most influential people in the world, in 2020.

In February 2022, Smith’s non-profit organization, the Student Freedom Initiative, partnered with Prudential Financial to provide up to  $1.8 million in microgrants to students of HBCUs.

In April 2022, Smith launched the Mount Sinai Robert F. Smith Mobile Prostate Cancer Screening Bus in Harlem, New York, in partnership with Mount Sinai Hospital.

In May 2022, Cornell University announced a $15 million donation from Robert Frederick Smith that will provide financial aid to engineering students from historically underrepresented communities. The gift will support an undergraduate scholarship fund to provide at least 7 students a year from urban high schools with up to $45,000 in grants, in addition to setting up a graduate fellowship fund to support 12 master’s students and five doctoral students who attended historically black colleges and universities.

In October 2022, media outlets including TMZ, Revolt TV, Variety, and Vibe Magazine published an article highlighting Smith being nominated by Floyd Mayweather, Jr. to serve as executive producer of a series of film and television projects titled "The GOAT" aimed to tell Mayweather's life story. Mayweather said:  “As someone who owns his own brand, I can’t think of better partners than Deon (Deon Taylor), Roxanne (Roxanne Avent Taylor), Robert F. Smith — the wealthiest African American in the world — and Hidden Empire Films, a prolific Black-owned production company.”

 Personal life 
In 1988, Smith married his first wife, fellow Cornell alum Suzanne McFayden. They divorced in 2014. Smith married Hope Dworaczyk, the founder and CEO of skincare company MUTHA, a former Playboy'' playmate, healthy living advocate, and fashion editor, on July 25, 2015 after she gave birth to their first child in December 2014.

Smith has three children with his first wife. He also has two sons and two daughters with his wife Hope.

Smith owns homes in Austin, Texas, Malibu, California, New York City, Denver, and Florida.

References 

1962 births
Living people
Activists against antisemitism
African-American billionaires
African-American engineers
African-American businesspeople
African-American inventors
African-American investors
American investors
American billionaires
American chemical engineers
American chief executives
American investment bankers
American philanthropists
American venture capitalists
American anti-racism activists
Businesspeople from Colorado
Businesspeople from Texas
Cornell University alumni
Columbia Business School alumni
Goldman Sachs people
People from Austin, Texas
21st-century American inventors
21st-century African-American people
People named in the Pandora Papers
20th-century African-American people